Kenora station is a heritage Canadian Pacific Railway station in Kenora, Ontario.

History
The one-and-a-half-storey, brick and stone railway station was built in 1899. In the early 20th century, the station featured a triangular-shaped garden and fountain area along the left of the structure.

The garden area was a feature of many Canadian Pacific Railway (CPR) stations of the era, starting in Montreal and going west. The railway felt this help attract settlers to the west. "Station gardens, characterized as effective advertisements for prairie fertility, were a prominent part of these campaigns. The station, especially in the west, was often the focus of the community and a major link with the outside world. Civic boosters said the only evidence of a town's worth immediately seen by a prospective settler was the condition of town's railway station." Kenora's is shown in period photographs as an early example of the CPR railway garden.

References

External links

Designated heritage railway stations in Ontario
Railway stations in Canada opened in 1899
Transport in Kenora
Railway stations in Kenora District
Canadian Pacific Railway stations in Ontario